Return to Paradise is the second live album by Styx, released in 1997, and their first album after signing with CMC International. It features songs from their successful reunion tour with Tommy Shaw, but without John Panozzo, who died in July 1996. It includes three new studio tracks, "On My Way," "Paradise," and "Dear John." Shaw wrote the latter as a tribute to Panozzo, while "Paradise" featured upon Dennis DeYoung's solo album and was newly recorded with the band.

Track listing

Disc 1
"On My Way" [*] (Tommy Shaw) – 5:02
"Paradise" [*] (Dennis DeYoung) – 4:29
"A.D. 1928" / "Rockin' the Paradise" (Dennis DeYoung, James Young, Tommy Shaw) – 5:23
"Blue Collar Man" (Tommy Shaw) – 4:34
"Lady" (Dennis DeYoung) – 3:28
"Too Much Time on My Hands" (Tommy Shaw) – 5:43
"Snowblind" (James Young, Dennis DeYoung) – 5:26
"Suite Madame Blue" (Dennis DeYoung) – 8:31
"Crystal Ball" (Tommy Shaw) – 5:56

Disc 2
"The Grand Illusion" (Dennis DeYoung) – 6:50
"Fooling Yourself (The Angry Young Man)" (Tommy Shaw) – 5:54
"Show Me the Way" (Dennis DeYoung) – 5:11
"Boat on the River" (Tommy Shaw) – 3:16
"Lorelei" (Dennis DeYoung, James Young) – 4:03
"Babe" (Dennis DeYoung) – 4:50
"Miss America" (James Young) – 6:15
"Come Sail Away" (Dennis DeYoung) – 8:33
"Renegade" (Tommy Shaw) – 6:01
"The Best of Times/A.D. 1958" (Dennis DeYoung) – 7:42
"Dear John" [*] (Tommy Shaw) – 3:03

* Newly recorded studio tracks

Personnel

Styx
 Dennis DeYoung – vocals, keyboards, accordion
 Tommy Shaw – vocals, acoustic and electric guitars, mandolin
 James "JY" Young – vocals, acoustic and electric guitars, keyboards
 Chuck Panozzo – bass, vocals
 Todd Sucherman – drums

Production
 Producer: Dennis DeYoung
 Engineer: Timothy R. Powell
 Mixing: Dennis DeYoung, Gary Loizzo
 Art direction: Ioannis, Linda Loiewski
 Design: Ioannis
 Illustrations: Ioannis
 Digital painting: Ioannis
 Photography: Mark Weiss

Charts

Singles

References

External links 
 Styx - Return to Paradise (1997) album review by Bret Adams, credits & releases at AllMusic.com
 Styx - Return to Paradise (1997) album releases & credits at Discogs.com

1997 live albums
Styx (band) live albums
CMC International live albums